Eduard Viktaravich Mikhan (born June 7, 1989, in Luninets) is a Belarusian decathlete.

Achievements

References

1989 births
Living people
Belarusian decathletes
Athletes (track and field) at the 2012 Summer Olympics
Olympic athletes of Belarus
People from Luninets District
Sportspeople from Brest Region